Bytów (formerly  ) is a town in the Gdańsk Pomerania region of northern Poland with 16,730 inhabitants as of December 2021. It is the capital of Bytów County in the Pomeranian Voivodeship.

The origins of Bytów can be traced back to the early Middle Ages when a fortified stronghold once stood near the town. In 1346 as Bütow it obtained Chełmno town rights from the Teutonic Order, which controlled it since 1329. During the Thirteen Years' War (1454–1466), the town was the site of heavy fighting and changed hands over time. Eventually, King Casimir IV Jagiellon granted the town to Eric II, Duke of Pomerania, as a perpetual fiefdom. After the Partitions of Poland, Bytów became part of the Kingdom of Prussia and later also Germany, within which it remained until the end of World War II. At the final stages of the war, Bytów was the center of heavy artillery shelling initiated by the Red Army, resulting in more than 55% of the buildings destroyed.

Throughout its whole history, Bytów was known to be a multicultural town inhabited by Kashubians, Poles, Slovincians, Germans, and Jews. Since 2000 a bugle call is played during important events which taking place in the area. Bytów is a popular tourist destination in the region of Pomerania and is famous for its medieval Teutonic Castle built in the late 14th century.

History

According to the city's official webpage the name Bytów comes from the founder of the settlement named "Byt". A settlement was first mentioned by the name of Butow in 1321.

Bytów passed to the Teutonic Knights in 1329. From 1335 comes the oldest mention of a Catholic parish, which, however, could have existed since the 12th or 13th century. In 1346 it was granted town rights. The castle seen today was built by the Knights between 1399 and 1405 at the site of the older castle, to protect their western border. It has been the seat of an administrator of the State of the Teutonic Knights.

This castle was captured by Poland after the Battle of Grunwald (1410), and king Władysław II Jagiełło of Poland gave it to Bogislaw VIII, Duke of Pomerania, for all of his lifetime as payment for support obtained from him against the Teutonic Knights. In the Peace of Thorn (1411) Bogislaw had to return the castle to the Knights. The town did not join the Prussian Confederation's revolt against the Teutonic Knights.

The town alternated between Poland and the monastic state during the Polish-Teutonic Wars, and returned to Polish control after the Second Peace of Thorn (1466). Poland gave Bytów as lien to the Dukes of Pomerania. Since 1526 the Pomerania dukes held it as an inheritable lien.

In 1627 during the Thirty Years' War, the town was rebuilt after being destroyed by a fire. When the Pomeranian dukes died out in 1637 Bytów ceased to be a Polish fief and became directly ruled by Poland, administratively part of the Pomeranian Voivodeship. Then the local nobility obtained equal rights with the nobility of the entire Polish–Lithuanian Commonwealth. Bytów was overshadowed by Lębork, which developed faster and became the seat of local starosts. In 1651 there was a dispute between the city authorities and the starost Jakub Wejher, regarding overdue taxes. To gain an ally against Sweden during the Deluge, in 1657 King John II Casimir of Poland gave the Lauenburg and Bütow Land to Margrave Frederick William of Brandenburg-Prussia as a hereditary fief in the Treaty of Bydgoszcz. Although Poland still retained sovereignty, the town was administered by Brandenburg and, after 1701, by the Kingdom of Prussia. Brandenburg imposed higher taxes to pay off its debts after the Thirty Years' War. During the 18th century, the town suffered from fires and plague.

In 1773 in the First Partition of Poland the town was wholly incorporated in the Prussian Province of Pomerania. In the 18th century attempts began at Germanisation of the indigenous Polish-Kashubian population by introducing German into schools. It remained a center of Polish resistance against Germanisation and was a Polish-Kashubian printing center. From 1846 to 1945, Bütow was the seat of the Landkreis Bütow district in Prussia. The town became part of the German Empire in 1871 during the Prussian-led unification of Germany. Polish minority remained active in the city, and in 1910 a Polish Bank Ludowy was founded here.

After the end of World War I and the re-establishment of independent Poland, the Treaty of Versailles kept the town in the Weimar Republic in 1919. There was an economic decline, many Germans emigrated to western Germany, and the population was slowly decreasing. In the interbellum numerous Polish organizations, including the Union of Poles in Germany, operated in the town. Poles were subjected to repressions. The hero of the local Polish population was a local Polish teacher, Jan Bauer, who was arrested by the Germans in 1929. Months before World War II, in 1939, the Germans carried out arrests of notable local Poles, incl. activists and the head of the local Polish bank.

It was captured by the Soviet Red Army on 8 March 1945. Some inhabitants had fled before the Soviet advance. In April 1945, it was put under Polish administration, confirmed after the end of the war by the Potsdam Conference and the Polish name Bytów was restored. Those German inhabitants, which had remained in the town or had returned to it short after the war, were later on expelled in accordance with the Potsdam Agreement. The indigenous Polish-Kashubian population was joined by Poles displaced from former eastern Poland annexed by the Soviet Union and from the rest of Kashubia.

Bytów became the seat of a powiat (1946–1975, 1999-) within Poland. From 1975 to 1998 it was administratively part of the Słupsk Voivodeship.

Kashubian Emigration to America
During the Kashubian diaspora, many families from Bytów such as the Brezas and the Pehlers emigrated to the area of Winona, Minnesota in the United States, beginning in 1859. The Prussian policy was to force the Kashubians out to make room for German settlers. Some Kashubians moved across the Mississippi River to Pine Creek, Wisconsin in the early 1860s. Many found jobs in the lumber mills during the lumber boom of the late 1800s occurring in the region.

Demographics
Up to the end of World War II most inhabitants of the town were Protestants.

Number of inhabitants by year

The above table is based on primary, possibly biased, sources.

Sights
 Bytów Castle of the Teutonic Knights, built in 1399–1405, former castle of the Teutonic Knights, Dukes of Pomerania from the Griffin dynasty, and Polish royal officials, now housing the West Kashubian Museum (Muzeum Zachodniokaszubskie)
 Gothic tower of the old Saint Catherine church from the 14th century, now a historic museum
 Church of St. George from the 17th century
 Saints Catherine and John the Baptist church
 Old railway bridge over Boruja river

Sports
Polish football club Bytovia Bytów is based in Bytów.

Notable residents 

 Szimón Krofey (1545–1589), Polish-Kashubian pastor, teacher and publisher
 Adolph Ferdinand Gehlen (1775–1815) German chemist, died from arsenic poisoning in Munich age 39
 Georg Warsow (1877-??) a German road racing cyclist who competed in the 1912 Summer Olympics
 Wilhelm Abel (1904–1985), German economist, particularly agricultural economics and economic history. 
 Hansjoachim Walther (1939–2005), politician, became member of the Third Kohl cabinet
 Natalia Szroeder (born 1995) a Polish singer, songwriter and TV presenter
 Kamil Małecki (born 1996) a Polish professional racing cyclist

International relations

Bytów is twinned with:

One regular activity is the exchange of high school students between Bytow and Winona, .

Municipality of Bytów
Sołectwos in the urban-rural commune (gmina) of Bytów include: Dąbie, Gostkowo, Grzmiąca, Mądrzechowo, Mokrzyn, Niezabyszewo, Płotowo, Pomysk Mały 
Pomysk Wielki, Rekowo, Rzepnica, Sierżno, Świątkowo, Udorpie, Ząbinowice.

Gallery

See also
 Lauenburg and Bütow Land
 Bytowa, a river

References
Footnotes

External links

 Official website
 Photo gallery 

Populated places established in the 12th century
Cities and towns in Pomeranian Voivodeship
Bytów County
Kashubian-American history
Kulm law